Ikram Ahmed is retired civil servant and former chairperson of the Bangladesh Public Service Commission.

Early life 
Ahmed was born on 14 April 1951.

Career 
In 2008, Ahmed was the Divisional Commissioner of Dhaka Division. He is the Convener of the Families United against Road Accident.

Ahmed was appointed chairperson of the Bangladesh Public Service Commission in December 2013. He replaced A. T. Ahmedul Huq Chowdhury as chairperson of the Bangladesh Public Service Commission. During his term the 34th Bangladesh Civil Service exam was delayed over a legal case filed by tribal applicants whose names were dropped from passing applicant after removal of quota.

In April 2016, Ahmed was replaced by Mohammad Sadique as chairperson of the Bangladesh Public Service Commission. 

In February 2022, Ahmed's name was proposed for the post of commissioner of the Bangladesh Election Commission by the Gonotantri Party.

References 

Living people
1951 births
Bangladeshi civil servants